The Men's Team Pursuit was one of the 10 men's events at the 2007 UCI Track World Championships, held in Palma de Mallorca, Spain on March 30, 2007.

49 cyclists from 12 countries participated in the contest. After the qualification, the fastest two teams advanced to the final and the 3rd and 4th fastest raced for the bronze medal.

The qualification took place on March 30 at 10:00 and the Finals on the same day at 20:15.

World record

Qualifying

Finals

References

Men's team pursuit
UCI Track Cycling World Championships – Men's team pursuit